Class Action and Phreek were disco and post-disco musical projects. The original Phreek comprised Christine Wiltshire, Leroy Burgess, Patrick Adams, Stan Lucas, Ken Mazur and others. Class Action was directed by Larry Levan and featured Christine Wiltshire as vocalist. Both groups are best known for their club hit, "Weekend", written by James Calloway and Leroy Burgess. The 1983 version was remixed by Morales and Munzibai and Larry Levan and produced by Bob Blank and Lola Blank.

History
The song "Weekend" was originally recorded on Atlantic Records by Patrick Adams' studio group Phreek of which Wiltshire was a member. The song was heavily played by Larry Levan yet it was commercially unavailable so it did not enter any charts. In the early 1980s, William Socolov, the co-owner of Sleeping Bag Records, invited Levan to make a new version of "Weekend". This version, recorded by the studio group Class Action, which also featured Wiltshire, became more successful than the original version, peaking at No. 49 on the British pop chart and No. 9 on the Billboard Dance chart.

Discography

Phreek
Albums
1978: Patrick Adams Presents Phreek (Atlantic)
Singles
1978: "Weekend / "Have A Good Day" (Atlantic)
1978: "Weekend / "May My Love Be With You" (Atlantic)
1983: "Weekend" (Original version) (Atlantic)

Class Action
Singles
1983: "Weekend" (Sleeping Bag)

Track listing
Phreek version

Class Action version

Chart performance

Legacy
 The Canadian group Killer Bunnies used the opening lyrics from "Weekend" as the basis for their 1997 single "I Can't Take the Heartbreak", which peaked at No. 36 on Billboard's Dance Club Songs Chart that same year.
 The song has featured in the 2006 video game Grand Theft Auto: Vice City Stories, on the Paradise FM radio station.
 In 1988, the song was covered by Todd Terry Project. This version also appeared in the 2004 video game Grand Theft Auto: San Andreas, on the SF-UR radio station.
 In 2004, Class Action's version was reissued on the Warlock Records label.

References

External links

Musical groups established in 1983
Musical groups disestablished in 1983
Musical groups established in 1978
Musical groups disestablished in 1978
American boogie musicians
American disco groups
1978 establishments in New York City